Nikolai Georgievich Makarov (born January 1955) is a Russian mathematician. He is known for his work in complex analysis and its applications to dynamical systems, probability theory and mathematical physics. He is currently the Richard Merkin Distinguished Professor of Mathematics at Caltech, where he has been teaching since 1991.

Career
Makarov belongs to the Leningrad school of geometric function theory. He graduated from the Leningrad State University with a bachelor's degree in 1982. He received his Ph.D. (Candidate of Science) from the Steklov Institute of Mathematics in 1986 under Nikolai Nikolski with thesis Metric properties of harmonic measure (title translated from Russian).. He was an academic at the Steklov Institute of Mathematics in Leningrad. Since 1991 he has been a professor at Caltech.

In 1986 he was an Invited Speaker of the ICM in Berkeley, California. In 1986 he was awarded the Salem Prize for solving difficult problems involving the boundary behavior of the conformal mapping of a disk onto a domain with a Jordan curve boundary using stochastic methods. In 2020, he was awarded the Rolf Schock Prize, "for his significant contributions to complex analysis and its applications to mathematical physics".

Research
Makarov works in complex analysis and related fields (potential theory, harmonic analysis, spectral theory) as well as on various applications to complex dynamics, random matrices and mathematical conformal field theory.

Makarov's most well-known result concerns the theory of harmonic measure in the complex
plane.  Makarov's theorem states that:
Let Ω be a simply connected domain in the complex plane. Suppose that ∂Ω (the boundary of Ω) is a Jordan curve. Then the harmonic measure on ∂Ω has Hausdorff dimension 1.

Makarov has also studied diffusion-limited aggregation which describes crystal growth in two dimensions with Lennart Carleson and Beurling-Malliavin theory with his former student Alexei
Poltoratski. He has studied the thermodynamic formalism for iterations of the rational functions
with another of his former students Stanislav Smirnov, Fields medallist. He has studied the stochastic properties of iterated polynomial maps with his former student Dapeng Zhan. He has studied the  universality laws and field convergence in normal random matrix ensembles.

His most recent research concerns the mathematical conformal field theory and its relation to Schramm–Loewner evolution theory.

Selected publications
  English version: 
 
 with S. Smirnov: 
 with  L. Carleson: 
 with  L. Carleson: 
 with I. Binder and S. Smirnov: 
 with Y. Ameur and H. Hedenmalm: 
 with N.-G. Kang: 
 with S.-Y. Lee:

References

External links
 Nikolai G. Makarov, Mathematics Professor, caltech.edu
 mathnet.ru

1955 births
Living people
20th-century Russian mathematicians
21st-century Russian mathematicians
Saint Petersburg State University alumni
California Institute of Technology faculty